The St. Petersburg 1914 chess tournament was one of the most famous chess tournaments of the early twentieth century. It included all the leading players of the time, and was won by World Champion Emanuel Lasker, who came from behind to narrowly defeat future World Champion José Raúl Capablanca.

Background

The tournament was held to celebrate the tenth anniversary of the St. Petersburg Chess Society. The president of the organizing committee was Peter Petrovich Saburov. Members of the committee were: Boris Maliutin, Peter Alexandrovich Saburov, and O. Sossnitzky. They intended to invite the present top twenty chess players, with world champion Emanuel Lasker, challenger José Raúl Capablanca, and the two winners of the All-Russian Masters' Tournament 1913/14 (Alexander Alekhine and Aron Nimzowitsch).  Amos Burn, Richard Teichmann, and Szymon Winawer declined for reasons, such as old age. From the other side, Oldřich Duras, Géza Maróczy, Carl Schlechter, Rudolf Spielmann, Savielly Tartakower, Milan Vidmar and Max Weiss declined due to tensions of Russia with Austria-Hungary in the year 1914. Finally, eleven top players from Germany, France, United Kingdom, United States, Cuba, and Russian Empire were accepted.

According to Chessmetrics ratings, the tournament was a class 18 tournament, including six of the then top 10 players in the world (#1 Rubenstein, #2 Capablanca, #3 Marshall, #4 Alekhine, #5 Nimzowitsch, and #6 Tarrasch).

Preliminaries
The preliminaries were held as a single round-robin tournament, with the top five places qualifying for the final.

The results and standings:

{|class="wikitable" style="text-align: center;"
! # !! Player !! 1 !! 2 !! 3 !! 4 !! 5 !! 6 !! 7 !! 8 !! 9 !! 10 !! 11 !! Total
|- 
| 1 || align=left |  ||*||½||½||1||½||1||½||1||1||1||1|| 8
|- 
| 2 || align=left | ||½ ||* ||½ ||½ ||½ ||0 ||1 ||½ ||1 ||1 ||1 || 6½
|- 
| 3 || align=left | ||½ ||½ ||* ||½ ||½ ||1 ||½ ||1 ||1 ||0 ||1 || 6½
|- 
| 4 || align=left | ||0 ||½ ||½ ||* ||1 ||½ ||1 ||½ ||½ ||½ ||1 || 6
|- 
| 5 || align=left | |||½ ||½ ||½ ||0 ||* ||1 ||½ ||½ ||1 ||1 ||½ || 6
|- style="background:#c5d2ea"
| 6 || align=left | ||0 ||1 ||0 ||½ ||0 ||* ||½ ||½ ||½ ||1 ||1 || 5
|- style="background:#c5d2ea"
| 7 || align=left | ||½ ||0 ||½ ||0 ||½ ||½ ||* ||½ ||½ ||1 ||1 || 5
|- style="background:#c5d2ea"
| 8 || align=left | ||0 ||½ ||0 ||½ ||½ ||½ ||½ ||* ||0 ||½ ||1 || 4
|- style="background:#c5d2ea"
| 9 || align=left | ||0 ||0 ||0 ||½ ||0 ||½ ||½ ||1 ||* ||0 ||1 || 3½
|- style="background:#c5d2ea"
| 10 || align=left | ||0 ||0 ||1 ||½ ||0 ||0 ||0 ||½ ||1 ||* ||½ || 3½
|- style="background:#c5d2ea"
| 11 || align=left | ||0 ||0 ||0 ||0 ||½ ||0 ||0 ||0 ||0 ||½ ||* || 1
|}

Final

The final tournament was a double-round tournament among the five players. The results of the preliminaries carried over into the finals, so Capablanca with a 1½-point lead was a heavy favorite to win the tournament. In the first half of the finals, Lasker narrowly escaped a loss against Capablanca, which would have virtually decided the tournament. Lasker made up half a point of the difference between himself and Capablanca, with the scores standing at Capablanca 11, Lasker 10, Alekhine 8½, Marshall 7, Tarrasch 6½.

In the 19th round, Lasker won a now-famous game against Capablanca with the Exchange Variation of the Ruy Lopez, trading queens on the sixth move (1.e4 e5 2.Nf3 Nc6 3.Bb5 a6 4.Bxc6 dxc6 5.d4 exd4 6.Qxd4 Qxd4 7.Nxd4) and then outplaying Capablanca in the endgame. Luděk Pachman remarks that Lasker's choice of opening was a masterstroke, since Capablanca was intent on simplifying the game to obtain a draw, and the line Lasker chose requires Black to play actively in order to exploit his advantage of the bishop pair and not allow White to exploit his superior pawn structure. Capablanca, intent on avoiding complications, played too passively and was routed by Lasker. In the following round, a shaken Capablanca lost as White from a superior position against Tarrasch. This allowed Lasker (who scored a remarkable 7/8) to overtake Capablanca, winning the tournament by a half point.

Lasker won 1200 rubles (in addition to his appearance fee of 4500 rubles), Capablanca 800 rubles, Alekhine 500 rubles, Tarrasch 300 rubles, and Marshall 250 rubles. In addition, there was a Brilliancy Prize Fund, of which Capablanca was awarded 125 rubles for his win over Bernstein, Tarrasch was awarded 75 rubles (Second Prize) for his win over Nimzowitsch, and Blackburne won 50 rubles (Special Brilliancy Prize) for his win over Nimzowitsch. The prize fund was more than covered by the record "gate" of 6,000 rubles from the spectators. Tarrasch wrote a famous book on this tournament in German, which was not translated into English until 1993.

The final results and standings:

{|class="wikitable" style="text-align: center"
! # !! Player !! Prel. !! 1 !! 2 !! 3 !!| 4 !!| 5 !! Total
|- style="background:#FAEB86"
| 1 || align=left |  ||6½ ||** ||½1 ||11 ||1½ ||11 || 13½
|-
| 2 || align=left |  || 8 ||½0 ||** ||½1 ||10 ||11 || 13
|-
| 3 || align=left |  || 6 ||00 ||½0 ||** ||11 ||1½ || 10
|-
| 4 || align=left |  || 6½ ||0½ ||01 ||00 ||** ||0½ || 8½
|-
| 5 || align=left |  || 6 ||00 ||00 ||0½ ||1½ ||** ||8
|}

Notes

References

Chess competitions
Chess in Russia
Sports competitions in Saint Petersburg
1914 in chess
1914 in the Russian Empire
1910s in Saint Petersburg
April 1914 sports events
May 1914 sports events